The Nationalist Democratic Progressive Party (NDPP) is a regional political party in the Indian state of Nagaland. Chingwang Konyak is the president of NDPP. The symbol of the party is a globe.

The NDPP was formed by Naga People's Front rebels who supported former Chief Minister of Nagaland Neiphiu Rio, and split to form the Democratic Progressive Party. In October 2017, the DPP changed its name to "Nationalist Democratic Progressive Party".

In January 2018, former Chief Minister Neiphiu Rio joined the party after the Naga People's Front broke its ties with the Bharatiya Janata Party for the 2018 Nagaland Legislative Assembly election. The NDPP then formed an alliance with the BJP for the election. Within the same month, 10 NPF MLAs quit the party and began negotiations with the NDPP.

In the 2018 Nagaland Legislative Assembly election, the NDPP won 18 seats with 253,090 votes and 25.20% vote share. They then came to power in a coalition with the BJP, with Rio as chief minister.

On April 29, 2022, 21 Naga People's Front Nagaland MLAs joined the Nationalist Democratic Progressive Party increasing the number of NDPP MLAs to 42.

References

External links

Official site
 Nationalist Democratic Progressive Party Official Website

 
Political parties in Nagaland
Political parties established in 2017
2017 establishments in Nagaland